Ahmad Bajouri Lebanese rugby league footballer who represented Lebanon in the 2000 World Cup.

Playing career
Bajouri was selected as part of the Lebanese squad in the 2000 World Cup however he did not play a game.

He made his National Rugby League debut for the Wests Tigers in 2002, playing in nine games before joining South Sydney for the 2003 NRL season. 

He played in eleven games for the club before he was involved in a car accident that ended his career. In 2009 a court awarded him over $1 million compensation for the crash due to loss of earnings.

References

1982 births
Living people
Lebanese emigrants to Australia
Sportspeople of Lebanese descent
Lebanese rugby league players
Lebanon national rugby league team players
Rugby league wingers
South Sydney Rabbitohs players
Wests Tigers players